Murad Hüseynov (born 25 January 1989) is an Azerbaijani former football forward.

Club career
Hüseynov has been a regular player for FK Mladost Lučani in the Serbian First League (Serbian second tier) where he played between January 2009 and January 2010. Previously he has played for FC Sheksna Cherepovets and FC Anzhi Makhachkala of Russia.

FC Gabala
In 2011, he was signed by Gabala FC after impressing Tony Adams. 
On 17 March 2011 Hüseynov made his debut for Gabala FC and also scored what turned out to be the winning goal in their game against FK Mughan.

In the 2012–13 season he played with Sumgayit also in the Azerbaijan Premier League.

Sloboda Užice
On 9 September 2013, he signed a contract with Serbian top league side FK Sloboda Užice. He was released two months later without making a single appearance.

Daugava Daugavpils
In March 2014 Huseynov made his league debut for FC Daugava in the Latvian Higher League. He scored his first league goal in a 5–3 victory over FK Liepāja on 30 April 2014, being precise from the penalty spot. In June 2014 he was released.

In January 2015, Hüseynov went on trial with Azerbaijan Premier League side FK Baku.

International career
In December 2010, he received his first call up to Azerbaijan after impressing Berti Vogts and was naturalised as a citizen of Azerbaijan from Russian citizenship.

He debuted against Hungary on 9 February 2011.

International goals
Scores and results list Azerbaijan's goal tally first.

References

External links
 Player's Profile on Soccer.ru
 
 Profile at Srbijafudbal.

1989 births
Living people
Azerbaijani footballers
Footballers from Makhachkala
Azerbaijani expatriate footballers
Azerbaijan international footballers
Association football forwards
FC Anzhi Makhachkala players
FC Baku players
FC Sheksna Cherepovets players
FK Mladost Lučani players
Serbian First League players
Expatriate footballers in Serbia
Expatriate footballers in Russia
Expatriate footballers in Latvia
Gabala FC players
Sumgayit FK players
FK Sloboda Užice players
FC Daugava players
FC Shinnik Yaroslavl players